The secretary of justice of Puerto Rico (known as the attorney general of Puerto Rico prior to the Constitution of Puerto Rico in 1952) is the chief legal officer and the attorney general of the government of Puerto Rico.

Attorneys general
The attorney general was appointed by the president of the United States and confirmed by the U.S. Senate.

1908–1910: Henry W. Hoyt
1910–1912: Foster H. Brown
1912–1914: Walcott H. Pitkin
1914–1919: Howard L. Kern
1919–1923: Salvador Mestre
1923–1925: Herbert P. Coats
1925–1928: George C. Butte
1928–1932: James R. Beverley
1932–1933: Charles E. Winter
1933–1935: Benjamin Jason Horton
1935–1939: Benigno Fernández García
1940–1942: George A. Malcolm
1943–1944: Manuel Rodríguez Ramos - Interim
1944:      Jesús A. González - Interim
1945:      Luis Negrón Fernández - Interim
1945–1946: Enrique Campos del Toro
1947–1948: Luis Negrón Fernández
1949–1951: Vicente Geigel Polanco
1951–1952: Víctor Gutiérrez Franqui

Secretaries
Under the Constitution of Puerto Rico, adopted in 1952, the office of Attorney General was renamed to Secretary of Justice. The secretary is appointed by the governor of Puerto Rico and confirmed by the Senate of Puerto Rico.
 1952: Victor Gutierrez Franqui
 1953–1957: José Trías Monge
 1965–1968: Rafael Hernandez Colon
 1968–1969:  Jose C. Aponte
 1970–1971: Blas C. Herrero
 1981–1983: Hector Reichard De Cardona
 1983–Sept.1983: Gerardo Carlo Altieri
 Sept.–Dec. 1983:Carmen Rita Velez Borras
 1984–1991: Héctor Rivera Cruz
 1991–1992: Jorge E. Pérez-Díaz
 1993–1997: Pedro Pierluisi
 1997–2000: José Fuentes Agostini
 January 2, 2001 – July 31, 2004: Anabelle Rodriguez
 August 11, 2004 – December 31, 2004: William Vazquez Irizarry
 January 2, 2005 – December 31, 2008: Roberto Sánchez Ramos
 January 2, 2009 – October 24, 2010: Antonio Sagardía
 October 24, 2010 – December 31, 2012: Guillermo Somoza
 January 2, 2013 – December 28, 2013: Luis Sánchez Betances
 January 23, 2014 – January 2, 2017: César Miranda
 January 2, 2017 – August 2, 2019: Wanda Vázquez Garced
 August 2, 2019 – July 16, 2020: Dennise Longo Quiñones
 July 16, 2020 – January 2, 2021: Inés Del C. Carrau Martínez
 January 2, 2021 – present: Domingo Emanuelli

Further reading
 Opinions of the Attorney General of Puerto Rico

References

Council of Secretaries of Puerto Rico